Jules Cantini (1826–1916) was a French sculptor and philanthropist.

Biography

Early life
Jules Cantini was born on February 2, 1826, in Marseille, Bouches-du-Rhône, France. His father was Gaétan Cantini, an Italian mason, and his mother, Thérèse (Farci) Cantini.

Career

He was a sculptor. In 1903, he did a marble replica of Michelangelo's David, which can be seen near the Plages du Prado in Marseille.

Some of his work can be found in Roman Catholic churches in Marseille. He designed the high altar inside the Église Saint-Vincent-de-Paul. Additionally, he designed the altars in the Marseille Cathedral. He also designed the altar in the Église Sainte-Agathe des Camoins. In 1886, he designed a statue of Saint Peter for Notre-Dame de la Garde.

Moreover, he designed the fountain in the gardens of the Château Simone in Meyreuil.

In 1911, he donated the fountain on the Place Castellane, which was sculpted by André-Joseph Allar (1845-1926). During its dedication on November 12, 1911, Bernard Cadenat (1853-1930), who served as the Mayor of Marseille from 1910 to 1912, compared him to Crinas, this, "doctor who donated his wealth for the restoration of the fortresses and the ramparts of the city" in the first century.

Personal life
He married Rose Lemasle on September 30, 1856.

Death
He died on December 12, 1916, in Marseille.

Legacy
The Musée Cantini is named in his honor; it is housed in his former private residence.
The Avenue Jules Cantini in Marseille is named in his honor.

References

1826 births
1916 deaths
Sculptors from Marseille
20th-century French philanthropists
20th-century French sculptors
19th-century French sculptors
French male sculptors
19th-century French philanthropists
19th-century French male artists